The United States Presidential Scholars Program is a program of the United States Department of Education. It is described as "one of the Nation's highest honors for students" in the United States of America and the globe.

The program was established in 1964 by Executive Order of the President of the United States to recognize the most distinguished graduating seniors for their accomplishments in many areas: academic success, leadership, and service to school and community. In 1979, it was expanded to recognize students who demonstrate exceptional scholarship and talent in the visual, creative, and performing arts. In 2015, the program was expanded once again to recognize students who demonstrate ability and accomplishment in career and technical fields. In the recent past, the organization has welcomed nominations from individual recommenders of the students' own choosing regardless of whether these students' academic results or achievements otherwise qualified them for recognition; however, per the organization's website, at present, "application for the U.S. Presidential Scholars Program is by invitation only. Students may not apply individually to the program or be nominated (outside of the above process)." Annually, the presidentially-appointed White House Commission on Presidential Scholars chooses up to 161 U.S. Presidential Scholars from among that year's senior class. All Scholars are invited to Washington, DC in June for the National Recognition Program, featuring various events and enrichment activities and culminating in the presentation of the Presidential Scholars Medallion during a White House-sponsored ceremony.

To commemorate their achievements, the scholars are individually awarded the Presidential Medallion in a ceremony sponsored by the White House.

Eligibility and selection process 
All candidates are invited to apply to the program in January of their graduation year. Applications are due in February. Semifinalists are announced in mid-April and all Scholars are announced during May. The National Recognition Program in Washington, DC usually occurs in June.

An overview of selection progression follows:

General
All graduating high school seniors who are U.S. citizens or legal permanent residents around the globe, enrolled in either private or public high schools, and who have scored exceptionally well on either the SAT of the College Board or the ACT Assessment of the American College Testing Program on or before October of each year are automatically considered for participation.

The United States Department of Education then examines the test records for the top 30 males and top 30 females in each state/jurisdiction. The combined file of scores from the top male examinees and top female examinees are then ranked from high to low in each state. The scores associated with the top 20 male examinees and top 20 female examinees are used to identify the candidates in each state. When ties occur in the threshold score, more than 20 persons of that gender are invited in that state. In addition, each Chief State School Officer (CSSO) may nominate up to ten male and ten female candidates, residing in the CSSO's jurisdiction, based on their outstanding scholarship. Additionally, the program is partnering with several recognition organizations that will each nominate up to 10 candidates from their individual programs. Each year approximately 4,000 students are invited to apply to the program.

Candidates then go through a rigorous application process where they must submit candidacy materials, including essays, self-assessments, secondary school reports, and transcripts. Candidates are evaluated on their academic achievement, personal characteristics, leadership, service, and other extracurricular activities, and an analysis of their essays.

In mid-April approximately 800 Semifinalists are chosen by a review committee of qualified individuals experienced in secondary and post-secondary education. Six to twenty Semifinalists are identified for each state/jurisdiction. The number of Semifinalists identified per state/jurisdiction is proportionate to the number of candidates for that state.

In May, the White House Commission on Presidential Scholars (a group of eminent private citizens appointed by the President across the country, representing the fields of education, medicine, law, social services, business, and other professions) makes the final selection of up to 161 Presidential Scholars. One male student and one female Scholar are chosen from each state, the District of Columbia, the territory of Puerto Rico, and from U.S. citizens and legal residents living abroad, whose parents are also U.S. citizens. In addition, up to fifteen Scholars are chosen at-large.

Arts

Overview
The National YoungArts Foundation reviews approximately 12,000 candidates annually of 15- to 18-year-old artists in the fields of visual, literary, performing and design arts. From these they select (through a blind adjudication process) the top 600-700 artists in the nation as National Winners. 171 of these Winners travel to Miami, Florida for National YoungArts Week, where they are further adjudicated by panelists and can win up to $10,000 to help them pursue a career in the arts. These 171 Winners are then narrowed down to 60 nominees that are recommended to the White House Commission on Presidential Scholars. These 60 candidates are invited to apply, and the Commission, in turn, selects the 20 U.S. Presidential Scholars in the Arts.

Selection
Students must register and participate in YoungArts, a national program of the National Young Arts Foundation designed to identify, recognize and encourage talented high school seniors who demonstrate excellence in cinematic arts, dance, design, jazz, music, photography, theater, vocal performance, visual arts or writing.

Based on the discipline entered, registrants must submit audiotapes, videotapes, slides or manuscripts demonstrating artistic accomplishment. One panel for each arts discipline evaluates applicants in a two-step blind adjudication process. The judges review material submitted by the applicants and select up to 20 award candidates in each of the ten disciplines for live adjudications in Miami (YoungArts also has National Merit and Honorable Mention Winners that can attend one of three Regional Programs in Los Angeles, New York City and Miami, Florida, as well). All applicants are judged against a standard of excellence within each artistic discipline, not against each other.

The final judging from the National YoungArts Week results in the recognition of excellence in five different award categories. Upon completion of the YoungArts program, YoungArts will nominate up to sixty students who meet the eligibility requirements for the U.S. Presidential Scholars Program. These students will be mailed candidacy materials and invited to apply to the program.

To be considered further, candidates must submit candidacy materials, including essays, self-assessments, secondary school reports, and transcripts. Candidates are evaluated on their academic achievement, personal characteristics, leadership, service, and extracurricular activities, and an analysis of their essays.

Arts candidates enter the U.S. Presidential Scholars Program selection process at the semifinalist level. In April the White House Commission on Presidential Scholars makes the final selection of up to twenty U.S. Presidential Scholars in the Arts.

Career and technical education
In 2015, the program was again extended to recognize students who demonstrate ability and accomplishment in career and technical education fields. Students are nominated through their Chief State School Officer (CSSO). Each CSSO can nominate up to five candidates who meet the U.S. Presidential Scholars candidacy requirements for the 2016 program. Candidacy materials are mailed to the selected students, and they are invited to apply to the program. To be considered further, candidates must submit candidacy materials, including essays, self-assessments, secondary school reports, and transcripts. Candidates are evaluated on their academic achievement, personal characteristics, leadership, service, and extracurricular activities, and an analysis of their essays. Career and Technical Education candidates enter the U.S. Presidential Scholars Program selection process at the semifinalist level. In April the White House Commission on Presidential Scholars makes the final selection of up to twenty U.S. Presidential Scholars in Career and Technical Education.

Prominent scholars

Academic
 Richard Alley (1976, Ohio) - geosciences professor at Pennsylvania State University
 Patrick Chovanec (1988, Illinois) - business professor at Tsinghua University, former aide to Speaker of the House John Boehner
 Prof Chris Morris (1988, New Hampshire) - business professor at MIT, former member of Council of Economic Advisors
 Elizabeth Kiss (1979, Virginia) - eighth president of Agnes Scott College, first female Warden of Rhodes House, Oxford University and CEO of the Rhodes Trust
 Kermit Roosevelt III (1989, District of Columbia) - author, law professor at University of Pennsylvania

Arts
 Suzette Charles (1981, New Jersey) – Miss America 1984, singer and entertainer
 Claire Chase (1996, California) - flutist, composer, professor of music Harvard University, and winner of a MacArthur Fellowship
 Rita Dove (1970, Ohio) – Poet Laureate of the United States, winner of Pulitzer Prize for Poetry
 Desmond Richardson (1986) – dancer, co-founder of Complexions Contemporary Ballet
 Josh Singer (1990, Pennsylvania) – screenwriter
 Conrad Tao (2011, New York) – pianist, composer and violinist
Dominique Thorne (2015, New York) – actress

Civil rights
 Martha J. Bergmark (1966, Mississippi) - attorney, civil rights advocate, writer, Executive Director of Voices for Civil Justice, recognized as Champion of Change by Obama White House in 2011, U.S. Presidential Scholars Foundation Roosevelt “Rosey” Thompson award, 2018.

Energy
 Amory Lovins (1964, Massachusetts) - environmentalist, Chairman and Chief Scientist of the Rocky Mountain Institute

Government and politics
 Donald S. Beyer Jr. (1968, District of Columbia) – U.S. House of Representatives (D, VA-8), former ambassador to Switzerland and Liechtenstein, former Lieutenant Governor of Virginia
 Mitch Daniels (1967, Indiana) – President of Purdue University, former Governor of Indiana, former Director of U.S. Office of Management and Budget
 Merrick Garland (1970, Illinois) – United States Attorney General, Judge of the United States Court of Appeals for the District of Columbia Circuit, Associate Justice nominee
 George P. Kent (1985, South Carolina) –  Deputy Assistant Secretary of State for European and Eurasian Affairs
 Bruce Reed (1978, Idaho) – CEO of the Democratic Leadership Council, former aide to President Bill Clinton
 Michelle Wu (2003, Illinois) – Mayor of Boston

Technology
 Clara Shih (2002, Illinois) – CEO of Hearsay Social

References

External links
 U.S. Department of Education Presidential Scholars Program
 Presidential Scholars Alumni Association
 Lists of past Presidential Scholars

Student awards
United States Department of Education
Scholars Program